Nicholas Constantine Christofilos (December 16, 1916 – September 24, 1972) was a Greek physicist. The Christofilos effect, a type of electromagnetic shielding, is named after him.

Career

Christofilos was born in Boston, Massachusetts and raised in Greece. He attended the National Technical University of Athens at age 18, and graduated with a degree in Electrical and Mechanical Engineering in 1938. He remained in Greece during World War II, working for an Athens elevator maintenance company during the German occupation. He later initiated his own elevator company. During all of this, he maintained an amateur interest in accelerator physics and high-energy particle physics, and studied German and American texts concerning the subjects extensively.

During 1946 he independently developed ideas for a synchrotron and in 1949 he conceived the strong-focusing principle for particle accelerators. Rather than publishing in a journal he submitted a patent application in the US and Greece. His discovery was unnoticed for several years, and strong focusing was rediscovered by Ernest Courant et al. in 1952 (who acknowledged his priority one year later), and applied to accelerators at Brookhaven National Laboratory (BNL), Cornell University and CERN.

Christofilos was offered a job at Brookhaven in 1953. In 1956 he joined Lawrence Livermore National Laboratory (LLNL) to continue his work on the Astron, a proposed fusion reactor planned during Project Sherwood. At LLNL, Christofilos worked on a number of military projects. He became a member of the JASON Defense Advisory Group and was the principal researcher for Operation Argus, a series of high-altitude nuclear detonations intended to create a radiation belt in the upper regions of the Earth's atmosphere as a defence against Soviet ICBMs.

In 1958 Christofilos proposed Extremely Low Frequency (ELF) waves as a way to communicate with submerged submarines, and subsequently invented the ground dipole, the only antenna that has proven practical for use at ELF frequencies. His ideas were implemented by the U.S. Navy as Project Seafarer, which constructed huge ELF transmitter facilities in Michigan and Wisconsin consisting of 56 miles (90 km) of electric transmission line.  These were used from 1985 to 2004 for worldwide communication with U.S. nuclear submarines.

In 1963 he was awarded the Elliott Cresson Medal.

Herbert York described Christofilos as follows:

Nick was a remarkable idea man. The ideas were usually not good, but they were really remarkable in that they were the kind of ideas that nobody else had. Nick really was a genius in a very important sense -- he often invented things that required two new ideas simultaneously, which is something that normally, hardly anyone ever does.

References

Footnotes

Sources

Further reading

External links
 Melissinos, A.C. (1993). "Nicholas C. Christofilos, His Contributions to Physics" (Talk), CERN Accelerator School Proceedings 1993, Rhodes, Greece
 Coleman, Elisheva (2004). Greek Fire – Christofilos and the Astron Project in America's Fusion Program, Princeton University Junior Thesis
 Ivoox.com
 Pictures of Nicholas Christofilos

1916 births
1972 deaths
20th-century Greek physicists
Accelerator physicists
Fellows of the American Physical Society
Greek expatriates in the United States
Lawrence Livermore National Laboratory staff
Members of JASON (advisory group)
National Technical University of Athens alumni
Scientists from Boston